The Town and Country Planning Act 1947 (10 & 11 Geo. VI c. 51) was an Act of Parliament in the United Kingdom passed by the Labour government led by Clement Attlee. It came into effect on 1 July 1948, and along with the Town and Country Planning (Scotland) Act 1947 was the foundation of modern town and country planning in the United Kingdom.

Today the main statutes in England and Wales are the Town and Country Planning Act 1990 and the Planning and Compulsory Purchase Act 2004, supported by the National Planning Policy Framework (NPPF) introduced in 2012. In Scotland the main statute is the Town and Country Planning (Scotland) Act 1997 and the Planning etc. (Scotland) Act 2006, supported by the National Policy Framework. In Northern Ireland it is the Planning Act (Northern Ireland) 2011.

Content
The Act established that planning permission was required for land development; ownership alone no longer conferred the right to develop the land. To control this, the Act reorganised the planning system from the 1,400 existing planning authorities to 145 (formed from county and borough councils), and required them all to prepare a comprehensive development plan.

These local authorities were given wide-ranging powers in addition to approval of planning proposals; they could carry out redevelopment of land themselves, or use compulsory purchase orders to buy land and lease it to private developers. They were also given powers to control outdoor advertising, and to preserve woodland or buildings of architectural or historic interest – the latter the beginning of the modern listed building system.

The Act provided that all development values were vested in the state, with £300,000,000 set aside for compensation of landowners. Any land would be purchased by a developer at its existing-use value; after permission to develop was granted, the developer would be assessed a "development charge" based on the difference between the initial price and the final value of the land. This charge was not payable in all cases – for example, cottages for agricultural workers, or limited enlargements to houses, were exempt. These charges were theoretically assessed by the Central Land Board, but it was intended that local district valuers would work with developers to agree a fair value; it was reported in 1949 that "where [a charge] is payable, the amount has been agreed by the developer in over 95 per cent of the cases". Where the landowner refused to sell land at the "undeveloped" price, the Central Land Board had authority to purchase it compulsorily and resell it to the developer.

In order to assist local authorities to carry out major redevelopment, the Act provided for extensive government grants. The Treasury would pay 50% to 80% of the annual expenditure for the first five years, depending on the financial situation of the authority; in exceptional cases, this could be increased to eight years. In areas of significant war damage, the rate was set at 90% of expenditure. After this initial period grants would continue, at a lower rate (50% in war-damaged areas, variable for others), for sixty years. Local authorities were given the power to raise loans to pay for this redevelopment, repayable over the same sixty-year period. Grants of 20–50% were available for related expenditure, such as the cost of acquiring land outside the main redevelopment areas.

Amendments
Later revisions of the Act were legislated in 1962, 1971 and 1990.  Whilst the 1990 Act is the current legislation in England and Wales, this Act has been substantially amended and added to, especially in 1991, 2004, 2008 and 2011. Devolution in Scotland has resulted in separate legislation, as has the devolved assembly in Northern Ireland. In 2018 the Welsh assembly consulted on proposed separate Welsh planning legislation.

See also
English land law

References 

Facts and Figures for Socialists, 1951. Labour Party Research Department, London, 1950

United Kingdom planning law
Local government legislation in England and Wales
Housing in the United Kingdom
United Kingdom Acts of Parliament 1947